Southwold railway station was located in Southwold, Suffolk. It closed in 1929, 50 years after it had opened for passenger traffic.
The station was demolished after closure and the site in Station Road is now occupied by the Police Station.

References

Disused railway stations in Suffolk
Former Southwold Railway stations
Railway stations in Great Britain opened in 1879
Railway stations in Great Britain closed in 1929
Southwold